Hyacintheae is a flowering plant tribe in the subfamily Scilloideae.

References 

 Manning, J.C., Goldblatt, P., & Fay, M.F. (2004) A revised generic synopsis of Hyacintheaceae in sub-Saharan Africa, based on molecular evidence, including new combinations and the new tribe Pseudoprospereae. Edinburgh Journal of Botany, 60: 533–568.
 Lebatha, P., Buys, M.H. & Stedje, B. (2006) Ledebouria, Resnova and Drimiopsis: A tale of three genera. Taxon 55: 643–652.

External links 

Scilloideae
Asparagales tribes